This is a list of the native wild mammal species recorded in Madagascar. As of June 2014 (following the IUCN reassessment of the lemurs) there are 241 extant mammal species recognized in Madagascar, of which 22 are critically endangered, 62 are endangered, 32 are vulnerable, 9 are near threatened, 72 are of least concern and 44 are either data deficient or not evaluated. All of the critically endangered species are lemurs.

The mammalian fauna of Madagascar is highly distinctive and largely endemic. The extant nonmarine, nonchiropteran taxa constitute (as of June 2014) 168 species, 40 genera and 9 families; of these, besides a probably introduced shrew, endemic taxa make up all the species, all the genera, and all but one of the families. This endemic terrestrial fauna, consisting of lemurs, tenrecs, nesomyine rodents and euplerid carnivorans, is thought to have colonized the island from Africa via four (or five, if aye-ayes arrived separately)  rafting events. The other historic terrestrial or semiterrestrial mammal group, the extinct hippopotamuses, is thought to have colonized the island possibly several times, perhaps via swimming.

Earlier in the Holocene, Madagascar had a number of megafaunal mammals: giant lemurs such as Archaeoindris which at over 200 kg was comparable in mass to the largest gorillas, as well as the hippopotamuses. The island also hosted flightless elephant birds weighing up to 700 kg, the largest known birds of all time. All of these went extinct following the first appearance of humans about 2000 years ago. Today, the largest surviving native mammals of the island, such as the indri and fossa, have weights only approaching 10 kg. Most if not all of the 29 listed extinct species are believed to have died out in prehistoric times; none of these are known to have survived into the post-European contact period.

The following tags are used to highlight each species' conservation status as assessed by the International Union for Conservation of Nature; those on the left are used here, those in the second column in some other articles:

Order: Afrosoricida (tenrecs, otter shrews and golden moles) 

The afrotherian order Afrosoricida contains the golden moles and otter shrews of sub-Saharan Africa and the tenrecs of Madagascar, families of small mammals that were traditionally part of the order Insectivora. All native tenrecs of Madagascar are believed to descend from a common ancestor that lived 29–37 million years (Ma) ago after rafting from Africa, with the split from their closest relatives, the otter shrews of equatorial Africa, dated to about 47–53 Ma ago.

Afrosoricida also contains the enigmatic extinct genus Plesiorycteropus, represented by two extinct species of dog-sized, probably insectivorous mammals restricted to Madagascar. Morphological analyses have tended to place them within Afrotheria close to aardvarks (order Tubulidentata), perhaps due to convergent specializations for digging. Analysis of preserved collagen sequences, however, places them in Afrosoricida closest to (and possibly within) tenrecs. The two species differ in size and aspects of morphology. They survived until as recently as 2150 BP.

Family: Tenrecidae (tenrecs)
Subfamily: Geogalinae
Genus: Geogale
 Large-eared tenrec, G. aurita LC
Subfamily: Oryzorictinae
Genus: Microgale
 Short-tailed shrew tenrec, Microgale brevicaudata LC
 Cowan's shrew tenrec, Microgale cowani LC
 Drouhard's shrew tenrec, Microgale drouhardi LC
 Dryad shrew tenrec, Microgale dryas VU
 Pale shrew tenrec, Microgale fotsifotsy LC
 Gracile shrew tenrec, Microgale gracilis LC
 Grandidier's shrew tenrec, Microgale grandidieri LC
 Naked-nosed shrew tenrec, Microgale gymnorhyncha LC
 Jenkins's shrew tenrec, Microgale jenkinsae EN
 Northern shrew tenrec, Microgale jobihely EN
 Lesser long-tailed shrew tenrec, Microgale longicaudata LC
 Microgale macpheei EX (PH)
 Major's long-tailed tenrec, (Microgale majori) LC
 Web-footed tenrec, Microgale mergulus VU
 Montane shrew tenrec, Microgale monticola VU
 Nasolo's shrew tenrec, Microgale nasoloi VU
 Pygmy shrew tenrec, Microgale parvula LC
 Greater long-tailed shrew tenrec, Microgale principula LC
 Least shrew tenrec, Microgale pusilla LC
 Shrew-toothed shrew tenrec, Microgale soricoides LC
 Taiva shrew tenrec, Microgale taiva LC
 Thomas's shrew tenrec, Microgale thomasi LC
Genus: Nesogale
 Dobson's shrew tenrec, Nesogale dobsoni LC
 Talazac's shrew tenrec, Nesogale talazaci LC
Genus: Oryzorictes
 Mole-like rice tenrec, Oryzorictes hova LC
 Four-toed rice tenrec, Oryzorictes teradactylus DD
Subfamily: Tenrecinae
Genus: Echinops
 Lesser hedgehog tenrec, Echinops telfairi LC
Genus: Hemicentetes
 Highland streaked tenrec, Hemicentetes nigriceps LC
 Lowland streaked tenrec, Hemicentetes semispinosus LC
Genus: Setifer
 Greater hedgehog tenrec, Setifer setosus LC
Genus: Tenrec
 Tailless tenrec, Tenrec ecaudatus LC
 Incertae familiae: Genus: †Plesiorycteropus
 Plesiorycteropus germainepetterae EX (PH)
 Plesiorycteropus madagascariensis EX (PH)

Order: Sirenia (manatees and dugongs) 

Sirenia is an order of fully aquatic, herbivorous mammals that inhabit rivers, estuaries, coastal marine waters, swamps, and marine wetlands. All four species are endangered. The dugong ranges widely along coastlines from east Africa to Australasia. It and the tenrecs are Madagascar's only extant afrotherians.

Family: Dugongidae
Genus: Dugong
 Dugong, D. dugon

Order: Primates 

The order Primates contains all the species commonly related to the lemurs, monkeys, and apes, with the latter category including humans. It is divided into four main groupings: strepsirrhines, tarsiers, monkeys of the New World, and monkeys and apes of the Old World. Strepsirrhines make up all of Madagascar's native primates species, but comprise only a quarter of those of Africa, the rest being simians. Madagascar's strepsirrhines occupy both diurnal and nocturnal niches, while all those of Asia and mainland Africa are nocturnal and nearly all simians are diurnal (the only exception being neotropical Aotus, which lives where strepsirrhines are absent). Madagascar's 15 genera of extant nonhuman primates compares with 6 in Central America, 20 in South America, 23 in Africa and 19 in Asia. A number of lemur species larger than any now alive, ranging in size up to that of a gorilla, are believed to have become extinct shortly after the recent arrival of humans.

The endemic primates of Madagascar, the lemurs, constitute a single clade and are the largest branch of strepsirrhines. It has been proposed that a common ancestor of all Madagascar's lemurs rafted across the Mozambique Channel from Africa between 50 and 60 million years ago. However, findings of similarities in dentition between  several African primate fossils and aye-ayes, the most basal of lemurs, have led to the alternate proposal that the ancestors of aye-ayes colonized Madagascar separately from other lemurs.

Between 2000 and 2008, 39 new lemur species were described, bringing the total number of recognized species and subspecies to 99; by 2014, the number of extant species and subspecies recognized had increased to 105. Of these, the IUCN classified 24 as critically endangered, 49 as endangered, 20 as vulnerable, three as near threatened, three as of least concern and four as data deficient; two were yet to be evaluated. 

Suborder: Strepsirrhini
Infraorder: Lemuriformes
 Family: Archaeolemuridae (monkey lemurs)
 Genus: Archaeolemur
 Archaeolemur edwardsi EX (PH)
 Archaeolemur majori EX (PH)
 Genus: Hadropithecus
 Hadropithecus stenognathus EX (PH)
Family: Cheirogaleidae
 Genus: Allocebus
 Hairy-eared dwarf lemur, Allocebus trichotis EN
Genus: Cheirogaleus
 Montagne d'Ambre dwarf lemur, Cheirogaleus andysabini EN
 Furry-eared dwarf lemur, Cheirogaleus crossleyi VU
 Groves' dwarf lemur, Cheirogaleus grovesi DD
 Lavasoa dwarf lemur, Cheirogaleus lavasoensis EN
 Greater dwarf lemur, Cheirogaleus major VU
 Fat-tailed dwarf lemur, Cheirogaleus medius VU
 Lesser iron-gray dwarf lemur, Cheirogaleus minusculus NE
 Ankarana dwarf lemur, Cheirogaleus shethi EN
 Sibree's dwarf lemur, Cheirogaleus sibreei CR
 Genus: Microcebus
 Arnhold's mouse lemur, Microcebus arnholdi VU
 Madame Berthe's mouse lemur, Microcebus berthae CR
 Bongolava mouse lemur, Microcebus bongolavensis EN
 Boraha mouse lemur, Microcebus boraha DD
 Danfoss' mouse lemur, Microcebus danfossi VU
 Ganzhorn's mouse lemur, Microcebus ganzhorni EN
 Gerp's mouse lemur, Microcebus gerpi CR
 Reddish-gray mouse lemur, Microcebus griseorufus LC
 Jolly's mouse lemur, Microcebus jollyae EN
 Goodman's mouse lemur, Microcebus lehilahytsara VU
 MacArthur's mouse lemur, Microcebus macarthurii EN
 Claire's mouse lemur, Microcebus mamiratra EN
 Manitatra mouse lemur, Microcebus manitatra CR
 Margot Marsh's mouse lemur, Microcebus margotmarshae EN
 Marohita mouse lemur, Microcebus marohita CR
 Mittermeier's mouse lemur, Microcebus mittermeieri EN
 Gray mouse lemur, Microcebus murinus NE
 Pygmy mouse lemur, Microcebus myoxinus VU
 Golden-brown mouse lemur, Microcebus ravelobensis VU
 Brown mouse lemur, Microcebus rufus VU
 Sambirano mouse lemur, Microcebus sambiranensis EN
 Simmons' mouse lemur, Microcebus simmonsi NE
 Anosy mouse lemur, Microcebus tanosi EN
 Northern rufous mouse lemur, Microcebus tavaratra VU
 Genus: Mirza
 Coquerel's giant mouse lemur, Mirza coquereli EN
 Northern giant mouse lemur, Mirza zaza VU
 Genus: Phaner
 Amber Mountain fork-marked lemur, Phaner electromontis EN
 Masoala fork-marked lemur, Phaner furcifer EN
 Pale fork-marked lemur, Phaner pallescens EN
 Pariente's fork-marked lemur, Phaner parienti EN
 Family: Daubentoniidae
 Genus: Daubentonia
 Aye-aye, Daubentonia madagascariensis EN
 Giant aye-aye, Daubentonia robusta EX (PH)
 Family: Indriidae
 Genus: Avahi
 Betsileo woolly lemur, Avahi betsileo EN
 Bemaraha woolly lemur, Avahi cleesei CR
 Eastern woolly lemur, Avahi laniger VU
 Southern woolly lemur, Avahi meridionalis EN
 Moore's woolly lemur, Avahi mooreorum EN
 Western woolly lemur, Avahi occidentalis VU
 Peyrieras's woolly lemur, Avahi peyrierasi VU
 Ramanantsoavana's woolly lemur, Avahi ramanantsoavanai VU
 Sambirano woolly lemur, Avahi unicolor CR
 Genus: Indri
 Indri, Indri indri CR
 Genus: Propithecus
 Silky sifaka, Propithecus candidus CR
 Coquerel's sifaka, Propithecus coquereli CR
 Crowned sifaka, Propithecus coronatus CR
 Von der Decken's sifaka, Propithecus deckenii CR
 Diademed sifaka, Propithecus diadema CR
 Milne-Edwards's sifaka, Propithecus edwardsi EN
 Perrier's sifaka, Propithecus perrieri CR
 Golden-crowned sifaka, Propithecus tattersalli CR
 Verreaux's sifaka, Propithecus verreauxi CR
 Family: Lemuridae (large lemurs)
 Genus: Eulemur
 White-headed lemur, Eulemur albifrons VU
 Gray-headed lemur, Eulemur cinereiceps CR
 Collared brown lemur, Eulemur collaris EN
 Crowned lemur, Eulemur coronatus EN
 Blue-eyed black lemur, Eulemur flavifrons CR
 Common brown lemur, Eulemur fulvus VU
 Black lemur, Eulemur macaco EN
 Mongoose lemur, Eulemur mongoz CR
 Red-bellied lemur, Eulemur rubriventer VU
 Red-fronted lemur, Eulemur rufifrons VU
 Red lemur, Eulemur rufus VU
 Sanford's brown lemur, Eulemur sanfordi EN
 Genus: Hapalemur
 Lac Alaotra bamboo lemur, Hapalemur alaotrensis CR
 Golden bamboo lemur, Hapalemur aureus CR
 Eastern lesser bamboo lemur, Hapalemur griseus VU
 Beanamalao bamboo lemur, Hapalemur griseus gilberti DD
 Eastern lesser bamboo lemur, Hapalemur griseus griseus VU 
 Ranomafana bamboo lemur, Hapalemur griseus ranomafanensis VU 
 Southern lesser bamboo lemur, Hapalemur meridionalis VU
 Western lesser bamboo lemur, Hapalemur occidentalis VU
 Greater bamboo lemur, Hapalemur simus CR
 Genus: Lemur
 Ring-tailed lemur, Lemur catta EN
 Genus: Pachylemur
 Pachylemur insignis EX (PH)
 Pachylemur jullyi EX (PH)
 Genus: Varecia
 Red ruffed lemur, Varecia rubra CR
 Black-and-white ruffed lemur, Varecia variegata CR
 Southern black-and-white ruffed lemur, Varecia variegata editorum CR
 White-belted black-and-white ruffed lemur, Varecia variegata subcincta CR
 Black-and-white ruffed lemur, Varecia variegata variegata CR
 Family: Lepilemuridae
 Genus: Lepilemur
 Antafia sportive lemur, Lepilemur aeeclis EN
 Ahmanson's sportive lemur, Lepilemur ahmansonorum CR
 Ankarana sportive lemur, Lepilemur ankaranensis EN
 Betsileo sportive lemur, Lepilemur betsileo EN
 Gray-backed sportive lemur, Lepilemur dorsalis EN
 Milne-Edwards' sportive lemur, Lepilemur edwardsi EN
 Fleurete's sportive lemur, Lepilemur fleuretae EN
 Grewcock's sportive lemur, Lepilemur grewcockorum CR
 Holland's sportive lemur, Lepilemur hollandorum CR
 Hubbard's sportive lemur, Lepilemur hubbardorum EN
 James' sportive lemur, Lepilemur jamesorum CR
 White-footed sportive lemur, Lepilemur leucopus EN
 Small-toothed sportive lemur, Lepilemur microdon EN
 Daraina sportive lemur, Lepilemur milanoii EN
 Mittermeier's sportive lemur, Lepilemur mittermeieri CR
 Weasel sportive lemur, Lepilemur mustelinus VU
 Otto's sportive lemur, Lepilemur otto EN
 Petter's sportive lemur, Lepilemur petteri EN
 Randrianasolo's sportive lemur, Lepilemur randrianasoloi EN
 Red-tailed sportive lemur, Lepilemur ruficaudatus CR
 Sahamalaza sportive lemur, Lepilemur sahamalazensis CR
 Scott's sportive lemur, Lepilemur scottorum EN
 Seal's sportive lemur, Lepilemur seali VU
 Northern sportive lemur, Lepilemur septentrionalis CR
 Hawks' sportive lemur, Lepilemur tymerlachsonorum CR
 Wright's sportive lemur, Lepilemur wrightae EN
 Family: Megaladapidae (koala lemurs)
 Genus: Megaladapis
 Megaladapis edwardsi EX (PH)
 Megaladapis madagascariensis EX (PH)
 Megaladapis grandidieri EX (PH)
 Family: Palaeopropithecidae (sloth lemurs)
 Genus: Archaeoindris
 Archaeoindris fontoynonti EX (PH)
 Genus: Babakotia
 Babakotia radofilai EX (PH)
 Genus: Mesopropithecus
 Mesopropithecus dolichobrachion EX (PH)
 Mesopropithecus globiceps EX (PH)
 Mesopropithecus pithecoides EX (PH)
 Genus: Palaeopropithecus (large sloth lemurs)
 Palaeopropithecus ingens EX (PH)
 Palaeopropithecus maximus EX (PH)
 Palaeopropithecus kelyus EX (PH)

Order: Rodentia (rodents) 

Rodents make up the largest order of mammals, with over 40% of mammalian species. They have two incisors in the upper and lower jaw which grow continually and must be kept short by gnawing. All the native nesomyid rodents of Madagascar are believed to descend from a common ancestor that rafted over from Africa 20–24 million years ago. There are about 39 nesomyid species in five subfamilies in Africa, compared to 27 in one subfamily extant in Madagascar. While nesomyids make up all of the native rodent species of Madagascar, they constitute less than 10% of those of Africa.

Suborder: Sciurognathi
Family: Nesomyidae
Subfamily: Nesomyinae
Genus: Brachytarsomys
 White-tailed antsangy, Brachytarsomys albicauda LC
 Brachytarsomys mahajambaensis EX
 Hairy-tailed antsangy, Brachytarsomys villosa VU
Genus: Brachyuromys
 Betsileo short-tailed rat, Brachyuromys betsileoensis LC
 Gregarious short-tailed rat, Brachyuromys ramirohitra LC
Genus: Eliurus
 Tsingy tufted-tailed rat, Eliurus antsingy DD
 Ankarana Special Reserve tufted-tailed rat, Eliurus carletoni
 Daniel's tufted-tailed rat, Eliurus danieli LC
 Ellerman's tufted-tailed rat, Eliurus ellermani DD
 Grandidier's tufted-tailed rat, Eliurus grandidieri LC
 Major's tufted-tailed rat, Eliurus majori LC
 Lesser tufted-tailed rat, Eliurus minor LC
 Dormouse tufted-tailed rat, Eliurus myoxinus LC
 White-tipped tufted-tailed rat, Eliurus penicillatus EN
 Petter's tufted-tailed rat, Eliurus petteri EN
 Tanala tufted-tailed rat, Eliurus tanala LC
 Webb's tufted-tailed rat, Eliurus webbi LC
Genus: Gymnuromys
 Voalavoanala, Gymnuromys roberti LC
Genus: Hypogeomys
 Malagasy giant rat, Hypogeomys antimena EN
 Hypogeomys australis EX
Genus: Macrotarsomys
 Bastard big-footed mouse, Macrotarsomys bastardi LC
 Greater big-footed mouse, Macrotarsomys ingens EN
 Petter's big-footed mouse, Macrotarsomys petteri DD
Genus: Monticolomys
 Malagasy mountain mouse, Monticolomys koopmani LC
Genus: Nesomys
 White-bellied nesomys, Nesomys audeberti LC
 Western nesomys, Nesomys lambertoni EN
 Nesomys narindaensis EX
 Island mouse, Nesomys rufus LC
Genus: Voalavo
 Eastern voalavo, Voalavo antsahabensis EN
 Naked-tailed voalavo, Voalavo gymnocaudus LC

Order: Eulipotyphla (shrews, hedgehogs, moles, and solenodons) 

Eulipotyphlans are insectivorous mammals. Shrews and solenodons closely resemble mice, hedgehogs carry spines, while moles are stout-bodied burrowers. There is one species of shrew on Madagascar, which is often considered to be conspecific with the widely distributed Etruscan shrew, Suncus etruscus, and likely to have been introduced to Madagascar from South or Southeast Asia by humans.

Family: Soricidae (shrews)
Subfamily: Crocidurinae
Genus: Suncus
 Madagascan pygmy shrew, S. madagascariensis

Order: Chiroptera (bats) 

The bats' most distinguishing feature is that their forelimbs are developed as wings, making them the only mammals capable of flight. Bat species account for about 20% of all mammals. Of the 46 species, 22 genera and 8 families of bats present on Madagascar, 36 species but only Myzopoda and Myzopodidae are endemic (the family was formerly present, however, on the African mainland). Paratriaenops is endemic to Madagascar plus the Seychelles.

Family: Pteropodidae (flying foxes, Old World fruit bats)
Subfamily: Pteropodinae
Genus: Eidolon
 Madagascan fruit bat, Eidolon dupreanum VU
Genus: Pteropus
 Madagascan flying fox, Pteropus rufus VU
Genus: Rousettus
 Madagascan rousette, Rousettus madagascariensis VU
Family: Vespertilionidae
Subfamily: Myotinae
Genus: Myotis
 Malagasy mouse-eared bat, Myotis goudoti LC
Subfamily: Vespertilioninae
Genus: Hypsugo
 Anchieta's pipistrelle, Hypsugo anchietae LC
Genus: Neoromicia
 Isalo serotine, Neoromicia malagasyensis VU
 Malagasy serotine, Neoromicia matroka LC
 Neoromicia robertsi DD
Genus: Pipistrellus
 Dusky pipistrelle, Pipistrellus hesperidus LC
 Racey's pipistrelle, Pipistrellus raceyi DD
Genus: Scotophilus
 Lesser yellow bat, Scotophilus borbonicus DD
 Marovaza house bat, Scotophilus marovaza LC
 Robust yellow bat, Scotophilus robustus LC
 Western yellow bat, Scotophilus tandrefana DD
Family: Miniopteridae
Genus: Miniopterus
 Miniopterus aelleni LC
 Miniopterus brachytragos LC
 Eger's long-fingered bat, Miniopterus egeri LC
 Glen's long-fingered bat, Miniopterus gleni LC
 Griffith's long-fingered bat, Miniopterus griffithsi DD
 Miniopterus griveaudi DD
 Miniopterus mahafaliensis LC
 Major's long-fingered bat, Miniopterus majori LC
 Manavi long-fingered bat, Miniopterus manavi LC
 Peterson's long-fingered bat, Miniopterus petersoni DD
 Sororcula long-fingered bat, Miniopterus sororculus LC
Family: Molossidae
Genus: Chaerephon
 Chaerephon atsinanana LC
 Black and red free-tailed bat, Chaerephon jobimena LC
 Grandidier's free-tailed bat, Chaerephon leucogaster LC
Genus: Mops
 Malagasy white-bellied free-tailed bat, Mops leucostigma LC
 Midas free-tailed bat, Mops midas LC
Genus: Mormopterus
 Peter's wrinkle-lipped bat, Mormopterus jugularis LC
Genus: Otomops
 Madagascar free-tailed bat, Otomops madagascariensis LC
Genus: Tadarida
 Madagascan large free-tailed bat, Tadarida fulminans LC
Family: Emballonuridae
Genus: Coleura
 African sheath-tailed bat, Coleura afra LC
Genus: Emballonura
 Peters's sheath-tailed bat, Emballonura atrata LC
Genus: Paremballonura
 Western sheath-tailed bat, Paremballonura tiavato LC
Genus: Taphozous
 Mauritian tomb bat, Taphozous mauritianus LC
Family: Nycteridae
Genus: Nycteris
 Malagasy slit-faced bat, Nycteris madagascariensis DD
Family: Hipposideridae
Genus: Hipposideros
 Hipposideros besaoka EX
Genus: Macronycteris
 Commerson's roundleaf bat, Macronycteris commersoni NT
 Macronycteris cryptovalorona DD
Genus: Paratriaenops
 Grandidier's trident bat, Paratriaenops auritus VU
 Trouessart's trident bat, Paratriaenops furculus LC
Genus: Triaenops
 Triaenops goodmani EX
 Triaenops menamena LC
Family: Myzopodidae
Genus: Myzopoda
 Madagascar sucker-footed bat, Myzopoda aurita LC
 Western sucker-footed bat, Myzopoda schliemanni LC

Order: Carnivora (carnivorans) 

There are over 260 species of carnivorans, the majority of which feed primarily on meat. They have a characteristic skull shape and dentition. The native terrestrial carnivorans of Madagascar are all euplerids, which are believed to descend from a common ancestor that rafted over from Africa 19–26 million years ago. Their closest relatives are the herpestids, the African and Eurasian mongooses. Malagasy mongooses are not "true" mongooses but rather are thought to represent an example of convergent or parallel evolution. About 30% of African terrestrial carnivoran species are herpestids.

Suborder: Feliformia
Family: Eupleridae
Subfamily: Euplerinae
Genus: Cryptoprocta
 Fossa, Cryptoprocta ferox VU
 Giant fossa, Cryptoprocta spelea EX (PH)
Genus: Eupleres
 Eastern falanouc, Eupleres goudotii VU
 Western falanouc, Eupleres major EN
Genus: Fossa
 Malagasy civet, Fossa fossana VU
Subfamily: Galidiinae
Genus: Galidia
 Ring-tailed vontsira, Galidia elegans LC
Genus: Galidictis
 Broad-striped Malagasy mongoose, Galidictis fasciata VU
 Grandidier's vontsira, Galidictis grandidieri EN
Genus: Mungotictis
 Narrow-striped mongoose, Mungotictis decemlineata EN
Genus: Salanoia
 Brown-tailed mongoose, Salanoia concolor VU
 Durrell's vontsira, Salanoia durrelli NE
Suborder: Caniformia
Clade Pinnipedia (seals, sea lions and walruses)
Family: Otariidae (eared seals, sealions)
Genus: Arctophoca
 Subantarctic fur seal, Arctophoca tropicalis LC

Order: Artiodactyla (even-toed ungulates and cetaceans) 

The even-toed ungulates are ungulates whose weight is borne about equally by the third and fourth toes, rather than mostly or entirely by the third as in perissodactyls. There are about 220 noncetacean artiodactyl species, including many that are of great economic importance to humans. Madagascar's only native artiodactyls are the extinct Malagasy hippos, which are believed to have descended from ancestors that managed to cross the Mozambique Channel from Africa in the late Quaternary, perhaps by swimming. Two or three hippo colonization events may have occurred. H. lemerlei is thought to be a dwarfed form of Africa's H. amphibius, while H. laloumena was larger. H. madagascariensis may be more closely related to the African pygmy hippopotamus, C. liberiensis (the generic assignment of both pygmy forms has been in flux). Skeletal features indicate that Malagasy hippos were better adapted for running than African hippos. H. lemerlei remains have been found in the rivers and lakes of western Madagascar, suggesting a semiaquatic lifestyle similar to that of H. amphibius, while many H. madagascariensis remains have found in Madagascar's forested highlands, indicating a more terrestrial lifestyle.

Family: Hippopotamidae (hippopotamuses)
Genus: Hippopotamus
 Lesser Malagasy hippopotamus, H. laloumena EX
 Malagasy dwarf hippopotamus, H. lemerlei 
 Malagasy pygmy hippopotamus, H. madagascariensis

Order: Cetacea (whales, dolphins and porpoises) 

The infraorder Cetacea includes whales, dolphins and porpoises. They are the mammals most fully adapted to aquatic life with a spindle-shaped nearly hairless body, protected by a thick layer of blubber, and forelimbs and tail modified to provide propulsion underwater. Their closest extant relatives are the hippos, which are artiodactyls, from which cetaceans descended; cetaceans are thus also artiodactyls.

Parvorder: Mysticeti
Family: Balaenopteridae
Subfamily: Balaenopterinae
Genus: Balaenoptera
 Common minke whale, Balaenoptera acutorostrata LC
 Antarctic minke whale, Balaenoptera bonaerensis DD
 Southern sei whale, Balaenoptera borealis schlegelii EN for B. borealis
 Bryde's whale, Balaenoptera edeni DD
 Pygmy blue whale, Balaenoptera musculus brevicauda DD
 Southern blue whale, Balaenoptera musculus intermedia EN for B. musculus
 Omura's whale, Balaenoptera omurai DD (among the most common rorquals of north-western Madagascar)
 Southern fin whale, Balaenoptera physalus quoyi EN for B. physalus
Subfamily: Megapterinae
Genus: Megaptera
 Humpback whale, Megaptera novaeangliae LC
Family: Cetotheriidae
Subfamily: Neobalaeninae
Genus: Caperea
 Pygmy right whale, Caperea marginata LC
Family: Balaenidae
Genus: Eubalaena
 Southern right whale, Eubalaena australis  LC (still rare in Madagascar)
Parvorder: Odontoceti
Family: Physeteridae
Genus: Physeter
 Sperm whale, Physeter macrocephalus VU
Family: Kogiidae
Genus: Kogia
 Pygmy sperm whale, Kogia breviceps DD
 Dwarf sperm whale, Kogia sima DD
Family: Ziphidae
Genus: Indopacetus
 Tropical bottlenose whale, Indopacetus pacificus DD
Genus: Ziphius
 Cuvier's beaked whale, Ziphius cavirostris LC
Subfamily: Hyperoodontinae
Genus: Mesoplodon
 Blainville's beaked whale, Mesoplodon densirostris DD
 Gray's beaked whale, Mesoplodon grayi DD
 Hector's beaked whale, Mesoplodon hectori DD
 Layard's beaked whale, Mesoplodon layardii DD
 True's beaked whale, Mesoplodon mirus DD
Superfamily: Delphinoidea
Family: Delphinidae (marine dolphins)
Genus: Steno
 Rough-toothed dolphin, Steno bredanensis LC
Genus: Grampus
 Risso's dolphin, Grampus griseus LC
Genus: Globicephala
 Short-finned pilot whale, Globicephala macrorhynchus LC
Genus: Sousa
 Indian Ocean humpback dolphin, Sousa plumbea EN
Genus: Tursiops
 Indo-Pacific bottlenose dolphin, Tursiops aduncus NT
 Common bottlenose dolphin, Tursiops truncatus LC
Genus: Stenella
 Pantropical spotted dolphin, Stenella attenuata LC
 Striped dolphin, Stenella coeruleoalba LC
 Spinner dolphin, Stenella longirostris LC
Genus: Delphinus
 Long-beaked common dolphin, Delphinus capensis DD
Genus: Lagenodelphis
 Fraser's dolphin, Lagenodelphis hosei LC
Genus: Peponocephala
 Melon-headed whale, Peponocephala electra LC
Genus: Pseudorca
 False killer whale, Pseudorca crassidens NT
Genus: Feresa
 Pygmy killer whale, Feresa attenuata LC
Genus: Orcinus
 Orca, Orcinus orca DD

Malagasy mammal names

Extinct megafauna

See also
Fauna of Madagascar
Fauna of Madagascar#Native names for extinct megafauna
Wildlife of Madagascar
Mesozoic mammals of Madagascar
Lists of mammals by region
List of prehistoric mammals
Mammal classification
List of mammals described in the 2000s

Notes

References

External links
Large database of local names of fauna of Madagascar with English and scientific names
 

Madagascar
Madagascar
mammals
'
'